Pajacuarán is one of the 113 municipalities of Michoacán, in central Mexico. The municipal seat lies at the town of the same name.

Localities 
The main towns and their population are the following:

References

Municipalities of Michoacán